Fidelio is a 1958 Australian television live recording of the opera Fidelio. It was one of a number of operas presented by the Australian Broadcasting Corporation at the time.

The opera had been performed that year by the Australian Elizabethan Theatre Trust. Sylvia Fisher sang Leonora.

See also
List of live television plays broadcast on Australian Broadcasting Corporation (1950s)

References

External links

Australian television plays based on operas
Australian Broadcasting Corporation original programming
Films based on operas
1958 television plays